Amos Moss (28 August 1921 – 8 April 2004) was an English professional footballer who made over 100 appearances as a left half in the Football League for Aston Villa.

Personal life 
Moss' father Frank Sr. and brother Frank Jr. were both professional footballers. He attended Burlington Street School in Aston and served in the British Armed Forces during the Second World War. After retiring from football, Moss ran a newsagents in Great Barr and later worked as a salesman until his retirement in 1991. He continued to work in a newsagents, owned by retired footballer Bobby Hope, until late 2003.

Career statistics

Honours 
Kettering Town

 Southern League: 1956–57

References 

English Football League players
English footballers
2004 deaths
Southern Football League players
Association football wing halves
1921 births
Footballers from Birmingham, West Midlands
Aston Villa F.C. players
Kettering Town F.C. players
Wisbech Town F.C. players
Kidderminster Harriers F.C. players
Rugby Town F.C. (1945) players
Kidderminster Harriers F.C. managers
British military personnel of World War II
English football managers
Salespeople